Cassine viburnifolia is a mangrove plant of tropical Asia in the staff vine family Celastraceae. The specific epithet  refers to how the plant's leaves resemble those of the genus Viburnum.

Description
The smooth bark is yellowish grey. The flowers are white. The fruits are obovoid in shape.

Distribution and habitat
Cassine viburnifolia grows naturally in the Andaman Islands, Thailand, Sumatra, Peninsular Malaysia, Borneo, the Philippines and Sulawesi. Its habitat is tidal rivers and mangrove channels.

References

viburnifolia
Flora of the Andaman Islands
Flora of Thailand
Trees of Malesia
Plants described in 1963
Taxonomy articles created by Polbot